Ángel Luis Lozada Novalés (Ángel Lozada) is a Puerto Rican novelist, activist, educator and scholar.

Early life
He was born in Mayagüez, Puerto Rico, in 1968.  He has a Bachelors in Sciences from George Washington University (1990) and a Masters in Science from Johns Hopkins University (1998).  He is a Ph. D. candidate at the European Graduate School.  He also engaged in graduate studies in Spanish and Portuguese Languages and Literatures at New York University under the supervision of Prof. Eduardo Subirats Rüggeberg.  He has studied creative writing with Chilean author Diamela Eltit.  He has published two novels, La Patografía and No quiero quedarme sola y vacía.

Ángel Lozada was a Jesuit from the Maryland Province (1994–1996).  He has been initiated in several African American religious traditions, and is a Palero (since 1998) and a Santero priest (since 2000), and has studied with several Palería, Ifá and Santería priests in New York City.  He is also a professional intuitive Tarot Reader, and has studied divination and the esoteric tradition with Rachel Pollack and Christine Payne-Towler.

Lozada now lives in Pittsburgh, but formerly lived in New York City.

Lozada's controversial writings focus on marginalized subjects, animalization, colonization, transculturation, the Puerto Rican Diaspora, and recently, on the relationships between writing, schizophrenia, power and culture as they are deployed via academic discourses and languages.  He has written extensively about the experiences of the Puerto Rican Gay subject within the larger context of postmodern, postindustrial American society.

Lozada is HIV-positive and has talked and written openly and explicitly about his health condition in his fiction and interviews.

Angel Lozada is currently at the PhD program in Philosophy, Art and Social Thought at the European Graduate School.

Published novels

Contribution to anthologies

Essays 
 Una re-visión epistemo-lógica de la educación superior pública de Puerto Rico. Editorial Letra y Pixel, enero 23, 2011
 America the Hungry. November 24, 2010
 Principles of Puerto Rican literary beekeeping. September 26, 2010
 El partido nuevo pato-fóbico.  October 24, 2004

Works in progress

References

Puerto Rican novelists
Puerto Rican male writers
People from Mayagüez, Puerto Rico
Puerto Rican gay writers
Puerto Rican LGBT novelists
American Santeríans
Johns Hopkins University alumni
George Washington University alumni
1968 births
Living people
Gay novelists
American male novelists